Soyuz TMA-22 was a crewed spaceflight to the International Space Station (ISS). TMA-22 was the 111th flight of a Soyuz spacecraft, and transported three members of the Expedition 29 crew to the ISS. The spacecraft docked to the ISS on 16 November 2011, and remained docked to serve as an emergency escape vehicle until its undocking on 27 April 2012. Soyuz TMA-22 successfully landed in Kazakhstan on 27 April 2012 11:45 GMT.

TMA-22 was the final flight of a Soyuz-TMA vehicle, following the design's replacement by the modernized TMA-M series. The launch of Soyuz TMA-22 was originally scheduled for 30 September 2011, but was delayed until 14 November following the launch failure of the Progress M-12M resupply vehicle on 24 August 2011. Soyuz TMA-22 was the first crewed mission to dock with the ISS since the Retirement of the American Space Shuttle fleet at the end of the STS-135 mission in July 2011.

Crew

Backup crew

Mission profile

Rescheduling of launch
Soyuz TMA-22's launch was rescheduled from late September 2011 to 14 November, due to the failed launch of the uncrewed Progress M-12M cargo spacecraft on 24 August 2011. The incident was caused by a blocked fuel line leading to the gas generator of the third-stage RD-0110 engine of the spacecraft's Soyuz-U booster. After the loss of Progress M-12M, all Russian crewed spaceflights were temporarily suspended, due to the similarities between the failed engine and the third-stage engine in use on the crewed Soyuz-FG booster. A Russian commission blamed the Progress M-12M failure on a single human error, and put additional procedures in place to prevent the problem from recurring. On 30 October 2011, Russia successfully launched the uncrewed Progress M-13M cargo spacecraft atop a Soyuz-U booster, clearing the way for the Soyuz TMA-22 launch.

Launch

Soyuz TMA-22 was launched on schedule from the Gagarin's Start launchpad at Baikonur Cosmodrome, Kazakhstan, at 04:14:03 UTC on 14 November 2011. Soyuz Commander Shkaplerov sat in the Soyuz's center seat, with flight engineer Ivanishin strapped in to his left and NASA astronaut Burbank sitting to his right. Nonetheless, conditions were deemed to be within acceptable parameters for launch.

The rocket followed a nominal ascent trajectory, and successfully inserted Soyuz TMA-22 into orbit approximately nine minutes after the launch. Once in orbit, the spacecraft deployed its two solar panels and communications antennas as planned.

Docking
Soyuz TMA-22 docked with the ISS at 05:24 GMT on 16 November 2011, about nine minutes earlier than planned. The Soyuz crew entered the ISS at around 6:39 GMT, and were greeted by Expedition 29 crewmembers Mike Fossum, Sergei Volkov and Satoshi Furukawa. Burbank, Shkaplerov and Ivanishin received congratulatory satellite calls from Russian dignitaries and family members before participating in a safety briefing led by Expedition 29 commander Fossum.

Deorbit
Soyuz TMA-22 undocked from the ISS on 27 April 2012 at 8:15 AM (GMT), carrying Burbank, Shkaplerov and Ivanishin, and landed safely near Arkalyk, Kazakhstan, at 11:45 AM the same day. The spacecraft's departure ended Expedition 30, and left astronauts Oleg Kononenko, André Kuipers and Don Pettit aboard the station to begin Expedition 31.

References

External links

YouTube video of Soyuz TMA-22's rollout and launch.
Soyuz TMA-22 astronaut .

Crewed Soyuz missions
Spacecraft launched in 2011
Spacecraft which reentered in 2012
Spacecraft launched by Soyuz-FG rockets